Shukranu is an Indian  film directed by Bishnu Dev Halder, starring Divyenndu, Shweta Basu Prasad and Sheetal Thakur. The film is produced by Reliance Entertainment.

Synopsis
Shukranu is a fictional story based on true incidents.
During Emergency in 1976 an estimated 6.2 million men were subjected to forced sterilization.
2 thousand of them lost their lives due to botched operations.
Set in Delhi/UP/Haryana, Shukranu is a comic take on the darkest phases of Indian democracy through the encounters of a would-be groom who is forcefully sterilized just days before his much-awaited marriage.

Cast
 Divyenndu as Inder
 Sheetal Thakur as Akriti
 Aakash Dabhade as Bhaanu
 Rajesh Khattar as Bhisham
 Shakti Singh as Maruti

References

External links
 

ZEE5 original films
2020 films
2020 direct-to-video films
Films set in 1976
Indian pregnancy films
Works about the Emergency (India)
Sterilization in fiction
Birth control in India